The FN 503 is a polymer frame striker-fired subcompact semi-automatic pistol manufactured in Columbia, South Carolina, by FN America, a division of FN Herstal. Introduced in March 2020, it is chambered in 9×19mm Parabellum and is intended for concealed carry.

Features
The FN 503 is a striker-fired handgun with a stainless steel slide. The three-dot iron sights are low-profile, while trigger pull averages . Magazines are either 6-round with a pinky extension or 8-round with a grip sleeve.

The FN 503 uses the "design, performance and reliability standards" of the FN 509, a full-sized pistol introduced in 2017.

References

External links
 
 FN 503  Concealability and Reliability of the Highest Caliber via YouTube

9mm Parabellum semi-automatic pistols
FN Herstal firearms
Semi-automatic pistols of the United States
Weapons and ammunition introduced in 2020